Elliott Heath (born February 4, 1989) is a runner who specialized in middle and long-distance disciplines. He competed at the 2012 US Olympic track trials for the 5000-meter race. He is the younger brother of Garrett Heath.

Running career
Heath was inducted into the 2017 Winona High School Hall of Fame.

High school
Heath made an immediate impact upon joining Winona High School's track team under coach John Ruggeberg, having already taken up running from sixth grade. While a senior at Winona he was the 2007 U.S. Junior Cross Country champion, and finished third in the two mile at the 2007 Nike Outdoor Nationals with a personal best of 8:46.12, which is a Minnesota high school record.

Collegiate
Heath was accepted by Stanford in 2007, the same university for which his brother Garett competed as a long-distance runner. Coached by Jason Dunn while at Stanford, he placed first in the 3000-meter race at the 2011 NCAA Division I Indoor Track and Field Championships.

Post-collegiate
In 2012, Heath signed a professional contract with Nike and started being coached by Jerry Schumacher. At the 2012 US Olympic Trials for track and field, Heath placed seventh in the 5000-meter race.

References

Stanford Cardinal men's track and field athletes
Living people
1989 births
People from Winona, Minnesota
Stanford Cardinal men's cross country runners
21st-century American people